Biodegradable electronics are electronic circuits and devices with a limited lifetime owing to their tendency to biodegrade. Such devices are proposed to represent useful medical implant, and temporary communication sensors.

Organic electronic devices as compostable material platforms have been fabricated on aluminum foil and paper to accommodate these expanded functionalities.  In one embodiment of this idea, paper films were utilized as a combination substrate and gate dielectric for use with pentacene-based active layers.  This idea was expanded upon to create complete circuits using foldable paper-based substrates.

Silk coatings could underpin an electronic devices because it melts away when the device is no longer needed. One test device, a heating circuit powered by beaming radio waves at it, was implanted under the skin of a rat with a wound. After the wound had healed, the implant simply melts away. The US military research agency DARPA funded research on building a tiny dissolving camera with this silk coating for use as a disposable spy camera.

Cable bacteria give insight to how biodegradable electronics could be made.

References

Electronics and the environment